The 2010 FA Cup Final saw ES Sétif beat CA Batna to win their seventh Algerian Cup. The match took place on Wednesday, 21 April 2010 at the Stade 5 Juillet 1962 in Algiers and ended 3–0 with a brace by Hocine Metref and an own goal from Saber Chebana. With his two goals, Metref was chosen as the Man of the Match.

Background
Prior to the 2010 final, ES Sétif had reached the final of the Algerian Cup six times, winning all six of them, while CA Batna had reached the final just once in 1997, losing to USM Alger in the final.

ES Sétif won both of the games between the two sides in the 2009–10 Algerian Championnat National, winning 2–1 at home and 3–0 in Batna.

Route to the final

Match details

See also
 2009–10 Algerian Cup
 Algerian Cup

References

External links
 Coupe d’Algérie 2010 (finale): ES Sétif – CA Batna (3-0) (Fiche technique)

Algerian Cup
Algerian Cup Finals
ES Sétif matches